The Dunbar Apartments, also known as the Paul Laurence Dunbar Garden Apartments or Dunbar Garden Apartments, is a complex of buildings located on West 149th and West 150th Streets between Frederick Douglass Boulevard/Macombs Place and Adam Clayton Powell Jr. Boulevard in the Harlem neighborhood of Manhattan, New York City. They were built by John D. Rockefeller, Jr. from 1926 to 1928 to provide housing for African Americans, and was the first large cooperative aimed at that demographic. The buildings were designed by architect Andrew J. Thomas and were named in honor of the noted African American poet Paul Laurence Dunbar.

The complex consists of six separate buildings with a total of 511 apartments (as constructed) and occupies an entire city block. The buildings center around an interior garden courtyard, with each building "U"-shaped so that every apartment receives easy air flow and direct sunlight at some point during the day.  The Dunbar is considered the "first large garden-complex in Manhattan."

The complex was designated a New York City Landmark in 1970, and was listed on the National Register of Historic Places in 1979.

History and description

The Dunbar Apartments were constructed as an experiment in housing reform, to alleviate the housing shortage in Harlem and to provide housing for African Americans.  Rather than being set up as rental apartments, the complex was a housing cooperative. Tenants were required to pay a down payment of $50 per room, and then $14.50 per room per month, much of which went towards a mortgage on the space. In 22 years, if payments were all made on time, the tenant would own the apartment.  The project was both the first large cooperative aimed at African Americans, and also New York City's first large garden apartment complex.

The original tenants were primarily middle class, and inexpensive childcare was provided on-site to support working mothers. However, the building opened in 1928, and the Great Depression began just a year later. The management of the complex was forced to loosen a number of cooperative rules in order to allow people to, for example, take in lodgers. Even so, too many tenants failed to make their payments and the buildings defaulted on their mortgage to Rockefeller.  He foreclosed in 1936, and a year later the buildings were converted to rental units.

In June 2013, the Dunbar Apartments were sold to the Brooklyn-based developer E&M Associates.  Plans were set in motion to upgrade the facilities and establish the Dunbar as one of the premier upscale complexes in Upper Manhattan.  These plans include renovating the vacant apartments, updating and refurbishing the interior courtyard and garden, and the addition of a variety of amenities including a fitness center, playground, additional security and a doorman.  The contract was acquired by Samuel Berry and Andrew Melohn of Douglas Elliman working in conjunction with Fredrik Eklund.

Notable residents
Noted personalities to live in the Dunbar Apartments include leaders of the Civil Rights Movement such as W. E. B. Du Bois, Paul Robeson, Noah D. Thompson, and A. Philip Randolph, author William Melvin Kelley, entertainer Bill "Bojangles" Robinson, poet Countee Cullen, and the explorer Matthew Henson.

See also
List of New York City Landmarks
National Register of Historic Places listings in New York County, New York

References
Notes

Bibliography
Tritter, Thorin. "The Growth and Decline of Harlem's Housing" in Afro-Americans in New York Life and History (January 31, 1998)

External links

A. Philip Randolph (1889–1979), labor leader, civil rights leader National Park Service – Historic places of the civil rights movement

Harlem
Residential buildings on the National Register of Historic Places in Manhattan
Historic American Buildings Survey in New York (state)
Residential buildings completed in 1926
Condominiums and housing cooperatives in Manhattan
Former cooperatives of the United States
Apartment buildings in New York City
New York City Designated Landmarks in Manhattan